Varnam-e Pain (also Romanized as Varnām-e Pā’īn; also known as Varnām and Varnām-e Soflá) is a village in Garmab Rural District, Chahardangeh District, Sari County, Mazandaran Province, Iran. At the 2006 census, its population was 116, in 24 families.

References 

Populated places in Sari County